Pseudocorynopoma is a genus of characins from tropical South America.

Species
There are currently 3 recognized species in this genus:
 Pseudocorynopoma doriae Perugia, 1891 - Dragon-fin tetra
 Pseudocorynopoma heterandria C. H. Eigenmann, 1914
Pseudocorynopoma stanleyi

References

Characidae
Fish of South America